Amir Rustemovich Miftakhov (born 26 April 2000) is a Russian professional ice hockey goaltender who is currently playing for Ak Bars Kazan of the Kontinental Hockey League (KHL). He was drafted by the Lightning in the 6th round of the 2020 NHL Entry Draft with the 186th pick overall.

Playing career
Miftakhov played as a youth and made his professional debut with Ak Bars Kazan of the Kontinental Hockey League (KHL).

On 3 May 2021, Miftakhov was signed by draft club, the Tampa Bay Lightning, to a three-year, entry-level contract beginning in the 2021–22 season.

Miftakhov made his North American hockey debut on 27 October 2021 with the Syracuse Crunch. He stopped 29 of 31 shots he faced in a 3–2 overtime win over the Hershey Bears. Miftakhov also recorded an assist on the game winning goal. Three games later, Miftakhov recorded his first North American shutout in a 4–0 win over the Laval Rocket.

Unable to find a footing within the Lightning organization in his lone season in North America, Miftakhov was mutually released for the remainder of his contract after clearing unconditional waivers on 2 July 2022.

References

External links
 

2000 births
Living people
Ak Bars Kazan players
Bars Kazan players
Orlando Solar Bears (ECHL) players
Russian ice hockey goaltenders
Sportspeople from Kazan
Syracuse Crunch players
Tampa Bay Lightning draft picks
Ice hockey players at the 2016 Winter Youth Olympics